Nyx is a symphonic poem by the Finnish composer Esa-Pekka Salonen.  The work was jointly commissioned by Radio France, the Barbican Centre, the Atlanta Symphony Orchestra, Carnegie Hall, and the Finnish Broadcasting Company.  It was premiered February 19, 2011 in the Théâtre du Châtelet, Paris, with Salonen conducting the Orchestre Philharmonique de Radio France.  The piece is titled after the Goddess Nyx from Greek mythology.

Composition
Nyx is composed in one continuous movement and has a duration of roughly 17 minutes.

Background
The piece marked Salonen's first purely orchestral composition since his 2005 composition Helix.  He commented on the composition of Nyx in the score program notes, writing:
He continued:

Title
The piece is titled after the Goddess Nyx from Greek mythology.  Salonen wrote of this inspiration:

He further remarked:

Instrumentation
The work is scored for a large orchestra comprising piccolo, three flutes (doubling piccolo), three oboes, cor anglais, three clarinets, bass clarinet, three bassoons, contrabassoon, four French horns, three trumpets, three trombones, tuba, timpani, three percussionists, harp, celesta (doubling piano), and strings.

Reception
Mark Swed of the Los Angeles Times wrote, "There are, in Nyx, any number of Salonen traits. The big orchestra climaxes vibrated all of Disney. I heard in the dappled instrumental colors a return to a slightly more European feeling in the composer's work. He has certainly not lost interest in Ravel, but there is also a Mahlerian kind of night music at work when grotesque details peek through the thick but transparent textures."  Arnold Whittall of Gramophone similarly lauded, "Nyx is a Greek goddess associated with night and Salonen's music is at its best when searching for a nocturnal atmosphere that is not simply drifting nebulously but moving forwards with a dream-like sense of menace and mystery."  Lawrence A. Johnson of the Chicago Classical Review called the music "intensely compelling" and described it as "Impressionism on steroids."  David Allen of The New York Times remarked, "Arguably, it's most evocative when most tender, as with the delicate flutters given to the piece's protagonist, the principal clarinet ..., or in the way the thick string textures dissolve toward the end, as if awaking from a dream."  Joshua Kosman of the San Francisco Chronicle praised Nyx as "far more than the sum of its influences" and called it "a rich and dazzling musical invention, a riotous showcase of ideas that unfolds in vivid and surprising ways".

Conversely, Andrew Clements of The Guardian felt that the composition "only confirms Salonen's position in the middle of the stylistic road."

References

Compositions by Esa-Pekka Salonen
2010 compositions
Symphonic poems
Music commissioned by the Atlanta Symphony Orchestra
Music commissioned by the Barbican Centre
Music commissioned by Carnegie Hall
Music commissioned by the Finnish Broadcasting Company
Music commissioned by Radio France
Nyx
Classical mythology in music